Rebeka Montoya is an American actress. Montoya is known for her recurring role as Delores Padilla in the ABC daytime soap opera, General Hospital, from 2011 to 2012. In 2014 she joined the cast of ABC comedy-drama series, Mistresses, as Antonia Ruiz. In 2004 Montoya had a role in the Telemundo telenovela Prisionera, and later guest-starred in Las Vegas, Castle, Southland, and Psych.

Filmography

References

External links

Living people
American television actresses
21st-century American actresses
Year of birth missing (living people)